Varkala Sivagiri railway station, station code VAK, is a major railway station (NSG 4 Category) in Kerala serving the town of Varkala in Thiruvananthapuram. It is the second-busiest railway station in the state capital district Trivandrum in terms of passenger movement and 14th busiest in Kerala State.
Around 54 trains halts in this station which handled more than 17,730 passengers daily with 3 platforms. It is on Kollam–Thiruvananthapuram trunk line. Station is well connected to major metropolitan & tier 2 cities like Trivandrum, Hyderabad, Kochi, Delhi, Bangalore, Mangalore, Chennai, Mumbai, Vijayawada, Kolkata, Goa etc.

Traffic

In 2018–19 FY about 41lakh passengers were passed through this station and make a profit of 11.12 cr. Varkala is the second-busiest railway station after . In close proximity to the station is Varkala Municipal Bus Station. It serves the people from northern part of entire Trivandrum district and southern part of Kollam district.

History

The metre-gauge railway line passing through the Varkala town was completed in 1917 and opened for traffic on 1 January 1918. The line was then up to Chakkai near Trivandrum. On 4 November 1931 it was extended to Trivandrum Central. Later, considering the steady increase in passenger traffic the metre-gauge was converted into broad-gauge which was inaugurated by the Prime Minister on 13 September 1977· There are two approach roads from Kallambalam and Parippally to Varkala railway station from the National Highway 66.

Name of the station
The station name used to be 'Varkala' till 2005. It was renamed "Varkala Sivagiri" after the samadhi of Sri Narayana Guru, situated in Varkala in the year 2005. Most of the trains are allowed temporary halt at this station during a week period of the famous "Sivagiri Theerthadanam" (Sivagiri Pilgrimage).

Significance

Varkala is a major commercial and industrial town in the district and also Varkala is the nearest major railway station for Attingal, Kilimanoor, Kallambalam, Chirayinkeezhu, Alamcode towns. Sivagiri Mutt founded by the social reformer Sree Narayana Guru is situated at the top of the Sivagiri hill in Varkala. Janardana Swami Temple is a Vaishnavite shrine which is estimated to be 2000 years old.

Annual passenger earnings of Varkala railway station

See also
Thiruvananthapuram Central railway station
Kappil railway station
Kollam Junction railway station
Paravur railway station
Karunagappalli railway station

Kazhakuttam railway station

References

External links

Railway stations in Thiruvananthapuram district
Thiruvananthapuram railway division